United States v. Stevens, 559 U.S. 460 (2010), was a decision by the Supreme Court of the United States, which ruled that , a federal statute criminalizing the commercial production, sale, or possession of depictions of cruelty to animals, was an unconstitutional abridgment of the First Amendment right to freedom of speech.

After this ruling, the statute was revised by the Animal Crush Video Prohibition Act of 2010 to have much more specific language indicating it was intended only to apply to "crush videos."

Background
Robert J. Stevens, an author and small-time film producer who presented himself as an authority on pit bulls, compiled and sold videotapes showing dogfights. Though he did not participate in the dogfights, he received a 37-month sentence under a 1999 federal law that banned trafficking in "depictions of animal cruelty."

District Court
Public Law No: 106-152 was a federal criminal statute that prohibited the knowing creation, sale, or possession of depictions of cruelty to animals with the intention of placing the depiction in interstate or foreign commerce for commercial gain. The law had been enacted in 1999, primarily to target "crush videos," which depicted people crushing small animals to gratify a sexual fetish. It excluded from prosecution "any depiction that has serious religious, political, scientific, educational, journalistic, historical, or artistic value." The language tracked the "Miller test," used by the U.S. Supreme Court to determine whether speech could be prosecuted for obscenity or was protected by the First Amendment.

In 2004, Stevens was indicted under 18 U.S.C. § 48 for creating and selling three video tapes, two of which depicted pit bulls engaged in dog fighting. The third tape depicted a pit bull attacking a domestic pig as part of the dog being trained to catch and kill wild hog and included "a gruesome depiction of a pit bull attacking the lower jaw of a domestic farm pig."

Although Stevens' criminal prosecution concerned only three tapes, he had made $20,000 in two and a half years from selling nearly 700 videos. Stevens was not accused of engaging in animal cruelty himself or of shooting the original footage from which the videos were created. However, the footage in each of the videos "is accompanied by introductions, narration and commentary by Stevens, as well as accompanying literature of which Stevens is the author."

Stevens filed a motion to dismiss the indictment by arguing that the federal statute abridged his right to freedom of speech under the First Amendment.  The District Court denied his motion in November 2004. In January 2005, Stevens was convicted by a jury, after a deliberation of 45 minutes.

Third Circuit
Stevens appealed, and the Third Circuit vacated his conviction, holding that 18 U.S.C. 48 violated the First Amendment. The court stated that dog fighting and the use of dogs to hunt hogs may be made illegal to protect animals from cruelty.

However  the court ruled that the law in question, prohibiting the depiction of animal cruelty, violates the First Amendment, as it would create a new category of speech that is not protected by the free speech provision of the Amendment.

Review by Supreme Court
The government appealed, asking that the Supreme Court overturn the appellate court ruling. On April 20, 2009, the Supreme Court agreed to review the lower court's decision. Oral arguments in the case were heard on October 6, 2009.

Stevens' attorney, Washington, D.C., lawyer Patricia Millett, has written:

In June 2009 the Animal Legal Defense Fund filed a brief in defense of the animals' interests. The brief encouraged the Court to recognize the protection of animals as a compelling government interest and to uphold Section 48.

More than a dozen media outlets joined an amicus brief in support of Stevens, including The New York Times, National Public Radio, the American Society of News Editors, the Association of Alternative Newsweeklies, Citizen Media Law Project, MediaNews Group, the National Press Photographers Association, the Newspaper Association of America, the Newspaper Guild–Communications Workers of America, Outdoor Writers Association of America, the Radio-Television News Directors Association, the Society of Environmental Journalists, and the Society of Professional Journalists.

Decision 
On April 20, 2010, the Supreme Court affirmed the appellate court ruling in an 8–1 decision written by Chief Justice Roberts, with Justice Alito dissenting. The Court found that Section 48 was substantially overbroad and so was invalid under the First Amendment to the United States Constitution.

Alito's dissent
Alito dissented, arguing that "(t)he most relevant of our prior decisions is Ferber, 458 U. S. 747, which concerned child pornography. The Court there held that child pornography is not protected speech, and I believe that Ferber'''s reasoning dictates a similar conclusion here."

Aftermath
On April 21, one day after the Supreme Court struck down the law, its original sponsor, Representative Elton Gallegly (R-CA) introduced a new bill with much more specific language, indicating it was intended only to apply to "crush videos." President Barack Obama signed the bill into law on December 9, 2010.

See alsoSnyder v. Phelps (2011)Bartnicki v. Vopper (2000)Church of Lukumi Babalu Aye v. City of Hialeah (1993)New York v. Ferber (1982)
North Carolina Highway Patrol K-9 incident

Notes

References

 
Orbach, Barak; Woolston, Allison. "Censoring Crimes", Cardozo Arts & Entertainment Law Journal (2011)
Schwartz, Matt; Steffans, Ben. "Lex Appeal: Analysis of the US v. Stevens ruling". Lex Appeal, July 31, 2010.
.
Eastburg, Rory. "Justices Hostile to Ban on Animal Cruelty Images", Reporters Committee for Freedom of the Press, October 6, 2009
Weiss, Debra Cassens. "Supreme Court to Weigh Law Barring Videos of Animal Cruelty", ABA Journal, April 20, 2009
Savage, David G. "Supreme Court to weigh depictions of animal cruelty", Los Angeles Times. September 23, 2009.
Liptak, Adam. "Free Speech Battle Arises From Dog Fighting Videos", New York Times. September 18, 2009
Green, Craig. "Distinguishing Bad Pictures from Bad Acts". Philadelphia Inquirer''. October 9, 2009

External links
Public Law 106-152, United States Government Printing Office.
Public Law 111-294, United States Government Printing Office.

United States Supreme Court cases
United States Free Speech Clause case law
2010 in United States case law
Baiting (blood sport)
Animal welfare and rights in the United States
United States Supreme Court cases of the Roberts Court